Coffee sauce is a culinary sauce that includes coffee in its preparation. It is sometimes prepared using instant coffee. Coffee sauce has been used in American cuisine since at least 1904. Coffee sauce may be sweet or savory.

Sweet preparations may use sweeteners such as sugar, simple syrup, maple syrup or golden syrup. Evaporated milk is sometimes used in sweet versions of coffee sauce, and some versions use whiskey to add flavor. Additional ingredients in some preparations include eggs and whipped cream.

Uses
Sweet uses of the sauce include its use on cakes, chestnuts, flan, ice cream, pancakes, puddings, tortes, soufflés, sweet potatoes and waffles.

Savory uses of the sauce include its use on salmon and steak.

Commercial preparations
A mass-produced coffee sauce has been manufactured for consumer purchase by the company Ahh!Gourmet, under the brand name Perky Savory Coffee Sauce.

See also

 Coffee syrup – prepared with three ingredients (water and sugar strained through coffee grounds), Autocrat Coffee began manufacturing coffee syrup in the 1940s. It is used in the preparation of coffee milk and other dishes and beverages.
 List of coffee dishes
 List of sauces
 Red-eye gravy – a thin sauce often seen in the cuisine of the Southern United States that sometimes includes black coffee in its preparation

References

Further reading
 Good Housekeeping. p. 238.
 

Sauce
Sauces